Yingkou East railway station  is a railway station on both the Panjin–Yingkou high-speed railway and the Harbin–Dalian high-speed railway. It is in Dashiqiao, Yingkou prefecture, Liaoning province, China. It opened along with the Harbin–Dalian line on 1 December 2012.

See also

Chinese Eastern Railway
South Manchuria Railway
South Manchuria Railway Zone
Changchun Light Rail Transit

References

Railway stations in Liaoning
Stations on the Panjin–Yingkou High-Speed Railway
Stations on the Harbin–Dalian High-Speed Railway
Railway stations in China opened in 2012
Yingkou